The Peninsular horseshoe bat (Rhinolophus robinsoni) is a species of horseshoe bat found in Malaysia and Thailand.

References

Taxa named by Knud Andersen
Rhinolophidae
Bats of Southeast Asia